Wombwell Main Football Club is a football club based in Wombwell, Barnsley, South Yorkshire, England.

History
Little is known of the formation of the club – they first came to prominence when entering the FA Cup in 1906. They have entered the FA Cup on a total of 10 occasions. They entered the Sheffield & Hallamshire County Senior League (S&HCSL) in 1996, and by 1998 they had won two successive promotions to reach the S&HCSL's Premier Division.

In their first Premier Division campaign they claimed the league championship – an achievement they would repeat on a further three occasions. They have also won the S&HCSL's League Cup three times, the first two in 2002 and 2008 giving the club a league and cup double.

Season-by-season record

Notable former players
Players that have played in the Football League either before or after playing for Wombwell Main –

  Colin Collindridge

Ground
The club plays on Hough Lane, Wombwell, sharing the same ground with the local cricket club.

Honours

League
Sheffield & Hallamshire County Senior League Premier Division
Champions: 1998–99, 2000–01, 2001–02, 2007–08
Sheffield & Hallamshire County Senior League Division 1
Promoted: 1997–98
Sheffield & Hallamshire County Senior League Division 2
Promoted: 1996–97 (champions)

Cup
Sheffield & Hallamshire County Senior League Cup
Winners: 2001–02, 2007–08, 2012–13

Records
Best FA Cup performance: 2nd Qualifying Round, 1908–09

References

Football clubs in England
Football clubs in South Yorkshire
Sport in Barnsley
Doncaster & District Senior League
Hatchard League
Sheffield & Hallamshire County Senior Football League
Sheffield & Hallamshire County FA members
Barnsley Association League
Mining association football teams in England